Hommage à Marguerite Bourgeoys is an outdoor 1988 sculpture and memorial depicting the founder of the Congregation of Notre Dame of Montreal of the same name by Jules Lasalle, installed in Place Marguerite-Bourgeoys, at 85 Notre-Dame Street East, in Montreal.

See also
 1988 in art

References

External links
 

1988 establishments in Canada
1988 sculptures
Cultural depictions of Canadian women
Cultural depictions of religious leaders
Monuments and memorials in Montreal
Outdoor sculptures in Montreal
Sculptures of women in Canada
Statues in Canada
Statues of religious leaders
Old Montreal